Red Sonja: Queen of Plagues is a 2016 animated sword and sorcery film featuring the character Red Sonja.

Adapted from the comic book storyline by Gail Simone and Walter Geovani, Queen of Plagues is an animated feature, with Misty Lee voicing the red-haired barbarian. The adaptation was produced by Shout! Factory, in partnership with Dynamite Entertainment and Red Sonja LLC.

Plot

Red Sonja, the She-Devil with a Sword, intends to pay back a blood debt owed to the one man who has gained her respect... even if it means leading a doomed army to their certain deaths. Who is Dark Annisia, and how has this fearsome warrior accomplished what neither god nor demon has been able to do - force Sonja to her knees in surrender? An epic tale of blood, lust, and vengeance, Queen of the Plagues takes Red Sonja from the depths of her own grave to the heights of battlefield glory.

Cast
 Misty Lee as Red Sonja
 Shannon Kingston as Ayla / Nias
 Becca Strom as Dark Annisia / Lila / Guard Girl / Seamstress / Female Soldier
 Scott McNeil as Tiath / Bazrat
 Tyler Nicol as King Dimat / Toda/Thief 1 / Zamora Soldier 1 / Blue Spine / Marauder / Purple Fishman / Hermit Fishman
 Mark Wheeler as Apos
 Brian Ward as Sonja’s Father / Peasant / Felth
 Dan Zachary as Ryshack / Archer / Grufo
 JJ Webb as Verdes / Boxer / Yellow Eyes / Thief 3
 Sean Patrick O’ Reilly as Tevius / Thief 2
 Brendan Hansell as Trident / Zamora Soldier 2 / Mob member / Puffer / Trident Piranha / Sharp Theet
 Joshua Larson as Puffer / Droop
 Kiefer O’ Reilly as Arrick / Brother 2
 Julie Shields as Female Patron

Production

Dynamite Entertainment, who publish the Red Sonja comic books, collaborated with animation studio Shout! Factory to produce the film.

The film was first announced on July 22, 2016 at the San Diego Comic-Con, and the announcement was accompanied by the first trailer.

Release

It was released in a DVD/Blu-Ray combo pack in the United States on August 2, 2016.

Reception

DVD Talk awarded it a mildly positive review, saying "Red Sonja: Queen Of Plagues won't win over those who can't get into motion comics but if you enjoy the format, this is a good one." High-def Digest awarded it three out of five stars, saying "It is a damn shame that this is a motion comic because all of the epic feel is sucked out of it and just comes off as a cheaply made cash-in on the recent comic book popularity."

References

2010s American animated films
2016 animated films
2010s fantasy adventure films
2016 films
American sword and sorcery films
Red Sonja
Films based on works by Robert E. Howard
High fantasy films
2010s English-language films